The 2001 Argentina rugby union tour of Europe were two a series of matches played by the Argentina national rugby union team. 
The first tour (four match) was held in June, the second (two match) in November.

Matches
Scores and results list Argentina's points tally first.

In New Zealand

In Great Britain

References

Sources

2001
2001
2001
2001
2001 in New Zealand rugby union
tour
2001–02 in Welsh rugby union
2001–02 in Scottish rugby union
History of rugby union matches between Argentina and Wales